Devil's Den is formed by a karst window, in which the roof over a subterranean river has collapsed, exposing the water to the open surface, near Williston, Florida. It is privately owned, and operated as a SCUBA diving training and recreational facility.

The water in the underground river is a constant  degrees. In cold weather water vapor rising from the surface of the river forms a visible plume above the entrance to the cave, which suggested a chimney from Hell to early settlers. The opening to the surface was originally a small solution sinkhole, through which visitors had to squeeze to reach the water. The opening was enlarged in the 1990s to ease access. The maximum depth of the cave reaches 54 ft/16.5 m with the surface diameter being 120 ft. The water level in the cave has fallen along with the water table in the area. However, as of 2018 the water level has risen above the main stage/platform. The cave was opened to the public as a dive site in the early 1990s.

The passage called chamber 3,  under water, contained animal and human remains and artifacts. The animal remains, which appeared to be associated with the human remains and artifacts, were from extinct (Pleistocene) species, including mastodons, ground sloths, camels, horses, dire wolves, bog lemmings, Florida spectacled bears, saber-toothed cats, and peccaries. The human remains have been dated to about 7,500 BC.

References

External links
Devil's Den Spring homepage

Archaeological sites in Florida
Caves of Florida
Landforms of Levy County, Florida
Williston, Florida